Blackstaff Halt railway station was on the Great Northern Railway in the Republic of Ireland.

The Great Northern Railway opened the station on 15 August 1927.

It closed on 14 October 1957.

Routes

References

Disused railway stations in County Monaghan
Railway stations opened in 1925
Railway stations closed in 1957
1925 establishments in Ireland
1957 disestablishments in Ireland
Railway stations in the Republic of Ireland opened in the 20th century